The 2021–22 Swiss Cup is the 97th season of Switzerland's annual football cup competition. The competition began on 13 August 2021 with the first games of Round 1. The final was held on 15 May 2022 at Wankdorf Stadium, Berne. FC Lugano beat last years runner-ups FC St. Gallen 4-1 and won their fourth Swiss Cup. 

FC Luzern are the title holders.

Participants

Round dates
The schedule of the competition is as follows.

Round 1
Home advantage was granted to the team from the lower league, if applicable. Teams in bold continued to the next round of the competition.

Round 2
Home advantage was granted to the team from the lower league, if applicable.

Round 3
Home advantage was granted to the team from the lower league, if applicable.

Quarter-finals 
Home advantage was granted to the team from the lower league, if applicable.

Semi-finals

Final

References

External links
 Official site

Swiss Cup seasons
Swiss Cup
Cup